James Cleary (28 September 1889 - 5 November 1937) was an Irish hurler. His career included two All-Ireland Championship victories with the Dublin senior hurling team.

Playing career

After moving to Dublin at an early age, Cleary joined the Faughs club in Templeogue. He won eight Dublin County Championships with the club between 1910 and 1923. Cleary's success at club level saw him drafted onto the Dublin senior hurling team. He won his first All-Ireland Championship title in the 1917 All-Ireland Senior Hurling Championship, before claiming a second winners' medal in the 1920 Championship. Cleary also won four Leinster Senior Hurling Championship titles in a five-year period between 1917 and 1921.

Personal life and death

Cleary was born just outside Nenagh, County Tipperary, the youngest of nine children of Cornelius and Annie (née Martin). After a brief education he spent his entire working life in Dublin, first as a grocer's assistant and later as a publican. Cleary married Johanna Connolly from Thurles in April 1926 and had two children.

On 5 November 1937, Cleary died aged 48 after suffering a stroke.

Honours

Faughs
Dublin Senior Hurling Championship (8): 1910, 1911, 1914, 1915, 1920, 1921, 1922, 1923

Dublin
All-Ireland Senior Hurling Championship (2): 1917, 1920
Leinster Senior Hurling Championship (4): 1917, 1919, 1920, 1921

References

1889 births
1937 deaths
Faughs hurlers
Dublin inter-county hurlers
All-Ireland Senior Hurling Championship winners